RiverTV is a Canadian OTT internet television service owned by VMedia that launched on June 4, 2020. RiverTV is a virtual multichannel video programming distributor (vMVPD), primarily offering Canadian specialty channels and video on demand content. 

The service initially launched in a closed beta on May 4, 2020 before releasing publicly in June with a free 7-day trial offer for new subscribers. It is the first standalone live TV service to launch in the country.

Programming  
RiverTV currently features live and on demand channels from various domestic television broadcasters, as well as several U.S-based networks not available on other providers.

Canadian networks
 
 Blue Ant Media
Cottage Life 
Makeful
Smithsonian Channel
T+E
 CBC/Radio-Canada 
CBC 
CBC News Network 
ICI Tele 
ICI RDI 
ICI Explora 
ICI ARTV
 Channel Zero 
CHCH Hamilton 
Rewind
Silver Screen Classics
 Corus Entertainment 
Adult Swim
Crime + Investigation
Food Network Canada
Global (feed varies depending on the province)
HGTV Canada
The History Channel
History2
Lifetime
MovieTime
National Geographic
Showcase
Slice
Teletoon
Treehouse
YTV
W Network
 WildBrain 
Family Channel 
WildBrainTV
Family Jr.

U.S Networks
Bloomberg Quicktake
Cheddar
Law & Crime
Newsmax
Newsy (Pulled from service). Newsy left international markets to focus on US domestic market. 
Revolt

Add-ons
Documentary Channel,  
ducktv 
France 24
Hollywood Suite 
i24 News
Mezzo Live HD
Nick+
Planète+
Super Channel
TRT Arabi 
TRT World

Availability
As of July 2020, RiverTV's content can be accessed through the service's apps for Roku, Amazon Fire TV, Apple TV, Android TV, Chromecast, and iOS devices within Canada.

Footnotes

References

External links
Official Website

Video rental services
Internet television streaming services
Subscription video on demand services
Canadian video on demand services
VMedia
2020 establishments in Canada